Phytoecia armeniaca is a species of beetle in the family Cerambycidae. It was described by Frivaldsky in 1878. It is known from Turkey, Syria, Azerbaijan, Armenia, and Iran.

Subspecies
 Phytoecia armeniaca natali (Lobanov, 1994)
 Phytoecia armeniaca armeniaca Frivaldsky, 1878

References

Phytoecia
Beetles described in 1878